Claude François Fraguier (27 August 1660, Paris – 3 May 1728, Paris) was a French churchman and writer.

Fraguier became a Jesuit at a young age, but he left the order in 1694 to devote himself to literature. A classicist and author of dissertations on classical history, he was professor of theology at Caen and collaborated on the Journal des savants. He was a friend of Huet, Segrais, Mme de Lafayette and Ninon de Lenclos.

He was elected to the Académie des inscriptions et belles-lettres in 1705 and to the Académie française in 1717.

Voltaire said of him in his Siècle de Louis XIV "he was a good littérateur and full of taste. He put Plato's philosophy into good Latin verse. He would have done better to have written good French verse."

External links
Académie française

References

 

1660 births
1728 deaths
Writers from Paris
French poets
Academic staff of the University of Caen Normandy
18th-century French Catholic theologians
French classical scholars
Members of the Académie des Inscriptions et Belles-Lettres
Translators to Latin
Translators from Greek
French translators
17th-century French translators
17th-century French Jesuits
French male poets
French male non-fiction writers
18th-century French male writers
17th-century French male writers
New Latin-language poets